Chana Porter is an American playwright, novelist, and education activist. Her debut novel, The Seep, was a finalist for the Lambda Literary Award for Transgender Fiction.

Career 
Chana co-founded the Octavia Project, "a free summer writing and STEM program for Brooklyn teenage girls and non-binary youth."

She has taught at University of Houston, Fordham University, Hampshire College, Goddard College, Weber State University, and Sarah Lawrence's Global Classroom.

Her plays have been developed or produced at The Flea Theater, Playwrights Horizons, The Catastrophic Theatre, La MaMa, Rattlestick Playwrights Theatre, Cherry Lane, The Invisible Dog, and Movement Research.

The Seep (2020) 
The Seep was published January 21, 2020 by Soho Press.

The book received a starred review from Publishers Weekly, Booklist, and Library Journal, as well as a positive review from Tor.com. The audiobook, narrated by Shakina Nayfack, received a positive review from Booklist.

The Seep was a finalist for the Lambda Literary Award for Transgender Fiction.

References

External links 
 Official website

Living people
American dramatists and playwrights
Year of birth missing (living people)